Huxian Airport is an airport located in Huyi District, Xi'an, Shaanxi Province, China.

History
During World War II, the airport was known as Huhsien (Yuehhsien) Airfield and was used by the United States Army Air Forces Fourteenth Air Force as part of the China Defensive Campaign (1942–1945).
People's Liberation Army Air Force (PLAAF) use the airport as a military base - Xi'an Air Base.

References

Further reading
 Maurer, Maurer.  Air Force Combat Units Of World War II. Maxwell Air Force Base, Alabama: Office of Air Force History, 1983. 521 p 
 Airfields & Seaplane Anchorages China Pacificwrecks.com

External links

Airfields of the United States Army Air Forces in China